The 2012–13 Ukrainian First League will be the 22nd since its establishment. The  competition commenced on 13 July 2012 when Obolon Kyiv visited Sumy and played a goalless draw against FC Sumy.
The competition had a winter break that started 25 November 2012 and resumed on 23 March 2013.

Promotion and relegation

Promoted teams
Three teams were promoted from the 2011–12 Ukrainian Second League
Group A
FC Sumy – champion (debut, however in the 2006–07 Ukrainian First League season Spartak represented the city of Sumy)
Group B
FC Poltava - champion (debut)
Avanhard Kramatorsk - promotion/relegation playoff finalist  (debut)

Relegated teams 
Two teams were relegated from the 2011–12 Ukrainian Premier League

 Obolon Kyiv – 15th place (returning after three seasons)
 PFC Oleksandria – 16th place (returning after one season)

Withdrawn teams 
Prior to the season starting Nyva Vinnytsia withdrew from the PFL.

Team locations

Map
The following displays the location of teams.

Stadiums 

The following stadiums are considered home grounds for the teams in the competition.

Managers

Managerial changes

Final standings

Results

Top goalscorers

The following were the top ten goalscorers.

Promotion/relegation play-off

A promotion/relegation home and away play-off were played by the 2nd team in Group 1 and 2 of 2012–13 Ukrainian Second League against the 15th and 16th placed teams of the 2012–13 Ukrainian First League competition. The draw for the play-off matches was held on 7 June.

Nyva Ternopil qualified from Ukrainian Second League.

Match #1

First leg

Second leg

6–1 on aggregate. FC Odesa after being relegated to Second League withdrew.

Match #2

First leg

Second leg

2–1 on aggregate. Dynamo-2 Kyiv remain in First League.

See also
 2012–13 Ukrainian Premier League
 2012–13 Ukrainian Second League
 2012–13 Ukrainian Cup

References

External links
  РЕГЛАМЕНТ Всеукраїнських змагань з футболу серед команд клубів Професіональної футбольної ліги сезону 2012 – 2013 років (Regulation of the All-Ukrainian competitions in football among teams of the Professional Football League clubs in the season 2012-13). Professional Football League of Ukraine website.

Ukrainian First League seasons
2012–13 in Ukrainian association football leagues
Ukra